Hoeflea phototrophica are aerobic marine bacteria from the genus of Hoeflea which was isolated from a culture of Prorocentrum lima.

References

External links
Type strain of Hoeflea phototrophica at BacDive -  the Bacterial Diversity Metadatabase

Rhizobiaceae
Bacteria described in 2006